Sergiusz Prusak (born 1 May 1979) is a Polish football coach and a former goalkeeper. He works as a goalkeeping coach for Górnik Łęczna, including the women's team.

On 26 February 2015, he was fined zl 2,000 for giving his support to Zawisza fans who are in conflict with their chairman when Górnik played Zawisza, through wearing a t-shirt with the slogan "Zawisza is a fans club"

As he was born in Pleszew, Greater Poland, he frequently reiterates that privately he is a fan of Lech Poznań, and even attends away games when he can.

External links

References 

Living people
Polish footballers
1979 births
People from Pleszew
Sportspeople from Greater Poland Voivodeship
Ekstraklasa players
Flota Świnoujście players
Górnik Łęczna players
Association football goalkeepers